Joel Scott Osteen (born March 5, 1963) is an American lay preacher, televangelist, businessman and author based in Houston, Texas. Known for his weekly televised services and several best-selling books, Osteen is one of the more prominent figures associated with prosperity theology and a fulcrum of its critics.

Early life and family 
Osteen was born in Houston, Texas, and is one of six children of John Osteen and Dolores ("Dodie") Pilgrim. His father, a former Southern Baptist pastor, founded Lakewood Church (of which Osteen is the current senior pastor) in the back of an old feed store. He graduated from Humble High School, a public high school in the city of Humble, Texas, in 1981, and attended Oral Roberts University in Tulsa, Oklahoma, where he studied radio and television communications but did not graduate. In 1982, he returned to Houston, founded Lakewood's television program, and produced his father's televised sermons for 17 years until January 1999, when his father died unexpectedly of a heart attack.

Career 

On January 17, 1999, Osteen preached his first sermon. On October 3, 1999, he was installed as the new senior pastor of Lakewood Church. In 2003, Lakewood Church acquired the Compaq Center, former home of the NBA Houston Rockets and the AHL Houston Aeros and renovated it. According to Osteen in 2008, Lakewood Church's weekly service TV program was viewed in more than 100 countries.

Osteen was included on Barbara Walters's list of the 10 Most Fascinating People of 2006. Former presidential candidate John McCain described Osteen as his favorite inspirational author. The Osteen family attended Easter breakfast hosted by President Barack Obama at the White House in 2010.

Preaching style 
Osteen's sermon preparation involves memorizing his remarks and listening to himself on tape. His sermons have been criticized as self-serving and revealing a poor command of scripture.  Osteen says he chooses to focus more on the goodness of God and on living an obedient life rather than on sin. He says that he tries to teach Biblical principles in a simple way, emphasizing the power of love and a positive attitude. When asked why he does not focus more on sin, the devil and hell in detail, Osteen stated in an interview with CBN News:

Events
Since 2004, Osteen, along with his wife, have hosted Night of Hope events, as well as their annual stadium event called "America's Night of Hope", in the U.S. and around the world. The event incorporates contemporary Christian music and inspirational messages to reach the masses at the venue and others watching online. Osteen also hosted an event at his Lakewood Church in 2018, in collaboration with rapper Kanye West, called Kanye’s Sunday Service. As per media reports, the event was attended by 17,000 as well as joined by many people streaming online. He also held his Easter service during COVID-19 with Mariah Carey and Tyler Perry.

Books 
Osteen's first book, Your Best Life Now: 7 Steps to Living at Your Full Potential, was released in October 2004, and reached the number 1 position on The New York Times Best Seller list.

He released his second book, titled Become a Better You: 7 Keys to Improving Your Life Every Day, in October 2007. It also topped The New York Times Best Seller list and had a first printing of three million copies. Osteen has said that the book focuses more on relationships and not getting stuck where we are in life.

Besides those two books, Osteen has written more than 18 others. See, Book list.

Personal life 
On April 4, 1987, Osteen married Victoria Osteen (née Iloff), who later would become co-pastor of Lakewood Church. They have a son and daughter. In 2002, his older siblings, Paul, Lisa, and Tamara, and his younger sister, April, were also involved in full-time ministry, and his half-brother Justin was doing missionary work.

Osteen lives with his family in a 17,000 square-foot mansion in River Oaks, with an estimated value of $10.5 million. Osteen says that as senior pastor, he draws no salary from the church, which has an annual budget of $70 million, and that he instead relies on income from book sales.

Political and social views 
Osteen has generally avoided discussing or preaching about controversial issues such as gay marriage, abortion, and politics. Having gone on record saying homosexuality is "not God's best", he has stated he believes the church has a tendency to become overly focused on single issues (such as homosexuality) to the point of neglecting others. When asked if he thought God approves of homosexuality, Osteen said homosexuality is a sin according to his interpretation of Scripture, but said gay people are welcome in his church without judgment.

In an interview on Fox News in 2008 during the Republican Party presidential primary race, when discussing whether he thought that Mormons were Christians, Osteen indicated that he believed that they were. He further revealed that he had not studied the religion. In an interview in 2011, Osteen stated his support for Israel.

Controversies

Prosperity gospel 
Osteen's sermons and writings are sometimes criticized for promoting prosperity theology, or the prosperity gospel, a belief that the reward of material gain is the will of God for all pious Christians.   Critics of prosperity gospel consider its teachings anathema to the gospel of Mark:

“Jesus, looking at the man, loved him and said, ‘You lack one thing; go, sell what you own, and give the money to the poor, and you will have treasure in heaven; then come, follow me.’ When the man heard this, he was shocked and went away grieving, for he had many possessions” (10:21-22). 

On October 14, 2007, 60 Minutes ran a 12-minute segment on Osteen, titled "Joel Osteen Answers His Critics", during which Reformed theologian Michael Horton told CBS News correspondent Byron Pitts that Osteen's message is heresy. Horton stated that the problem with Osteen's message is that it makes religion about us instead of about God.

Osteen is estimated to have a net worth of over $50 million, with his church taking in $43 million a year in collections.  According to the Houston Chronicle Osteen’s church’s income was $89 million in the year ending March 2017. More than 90 percent of that was raised from church followers and barely one percent of its budget went to charitable causes. Osteen denied taking any pandemic CARES Act assistance, but U.S. Small Business Administration data revealed his church actually received 4.4 million dollars from the fund.

Hurricane Harvey response 
During the immediate aftermath of Hurricane Harvey in August 2017, Osteen received significant criticism for not making Lakewood Church, a 606,000-square-foot, 16,000-seat former sports arena, available as an emergency shelter for those displaced by the storm. On August 27, posts from the church and a Lakewood Church associate pastor's social media accounts stated that the church was "inaccessible due to severe flooding," and associate pastor John Gray posted further, "If WE could get there WE WOULD OPEN THE DOORS."  Lakewood spokesperson Don Iloff later described floodwaters as one foot from spilling over the facility's floodgate and surging into the building. He also stated that pictures showing Lakewood free of flooding were taken on Monday, after the flood waters had lowered.

Osteen disputed the claim that flood waters closed the church, saying "the church has been open from the beginning," and, "[w]e've always been open ... How this notion got started, that we're not a shelter and we're not taking people in is a false narrative." This contradicted his earlier statement that the church would open when other refugee centers were full. On the evening of August 28, it was announced by Lakewood that it would open at noon the next day as an available shelter to storm victims and emergency personnel, which it did.

On August 15, 2018, less than a year after Harvey struck, the City of Houston and Mayor Sylvester Turner proclaimed a day in honor of the assistance of Lakewood and Osteen in rebuilding efforts across the Houston area.

Other 
In 2011, Osteen and Lakewood Church were sued by the band The American Dollar for copyright infringement. A judge in 2012 ruled in favor of Osteen, but gave The American Dollar leave to amend the case.

Filmography

Partial list of books 
 Your Best Life Now: 7 Steps to Living at Your Full Potential (2004)
Daily Readings from Your Best Life Now: 90 Devotions for Living at Your Full Potential (2005)
 Become a Better You: 7 Keys to Improving Your Life Every Day (2007)
Your Best Life Begins Each Morning: Devotions to Start Every New Day of the Year (2008)
 It's Your Time : Activate Your Faith, Achieve Your Dreams, and Increase in God's Favor (2009)
It's Your Time: Finding Favor, Restoration, and Abundance in Your Life Every Day (2009)
Everyday a Friday: How to Be Happier 7 Days a Week (2011)
I Declare: 31 Promises to Speak Over Your Life (2012)
Break Out!: 5 Keys to Go Beyond Your Barriers and Live an Extraordinary Life (2013)
You Can You Will: 8 Undeniable Qualities of a Winner (2014)
Fresh Start: the New You Begins Today (2015)
The Power of I Am: Two Words That Will Change Your Life Today (2015)
Think Better, Live Better: A Victorious Life Begins in Your Mind (2016)
Blessed in the Darkness: How All Things Are Working for Your Good (2017)
Empty Out the Negative (2017)
Next Level Thinking: 10 Powerful Thoughts for a Successful and Abundant Life (2018)
The Power of Favor: The Force That Will Take You Where You Can't Go on Your Own (2019)
The Abundance Mind-Set: Success Starts Here (2020)
Peaceful on Purpose: The Power to Remain Calm, Strong, and Confident in Every Season (2021)
You Are Stronger than You Think: Unleash the Power to Go Bigger, Go Bold, and Go Beyond What Limits You (2021)
Rule Your Day: 6 Keys to Maximizing Your Success and Accelerating Your Dreams (2022)
Your Greater is Coming: Discover the Path to Your Bigger, Better, and Brighter Future (2022)

See also 
 Christianity in Houston
 Charismatic movement
 Gospel of success
 Word of Faith
Lakewood Church

References

External links 
 

1963 births
Living people
20th-century American male writers
20th-century American non-fiction writers
20th-century Protestant religious leaders
21st-century American male writers
21st-century American non-fiction writers
21st-century Protestant religious leaders
American Charismatics
American male non-fiction writers
American Pentecostal pastors
American self-help writers
American television evangelists
Intelligent design advocates
Oral Roberts University alumni
Pentecostal writers
Pentecostals from Texas
Prosperity theologians
Religious leaders from Texas
Writers from Houston